Donald or Don Young may refer to:
Don Young (1933–2022), American politician from Alaska
Donald A. Young (1929–2015), Canadian agriculturalist
Donald Young (baseball) (Don Young, born 1945), American baseball player
Donald Young (tennis) (born 1989), American tennis player 
Donald Gary Young (1949–2018), American businessman
Donald Anthony Walker Young, ran a Ponzi scheme
Donnie Young (police officer), Denver police detective who was shot and killed
Donny Young, an early recording name of Johnny Paycheck (1938-2003)
Don John Young (1910–1996), United States federal judge
Don Carlos Young (1855–1938), American architect 
 Don Young (bishop) (born 1944), bishop of Central Newfoundland